Tumaini University Dar es Salaam College (TUMADARCo) is a constituent college of Tumaini University Makumira in Dar es Salaam, Tanzania.

References

External links
 

Colleges in Tanzania
Education in Dar es Salaam
Educational institutions established in 2007
2007 establishments in Tanzania